Lester Morgan Suazo (2 May 1976 – 1 November 2002) was a Costa Rican professional footballer who played as a goalkeeper.

Club career
Born in Santa Cruz de Guanacaste, Morgan tried his luck as a sweeper and center-forward before turning to the role of goalkeeper. He made his professional debut for Guanacasteca on 10 September 1995 against Belén and joined Herediano for the 1996–97 season. He had been unlucky with injuries, which often struck him just as his international career seemed set to take off. He had a brief season in Mexico with Venados de Yucatán before returning to Costa Rica.

International career
Morgan was a member of the Costa Rican squad in the 1995 World Youth Cup in Qatar.

Morgan made six appearances for the senior Costa Rica national football team and was a participant at the 2002 FIFA World Cup in South Korea and Japan. He made his debut for the Ticos in a friendly against Jamaica on 24 February 1999 and collected his sixth and final cap against Colombia just before the 2002 World Cup Finals.

Death
Morgan committed suicide on 31 October 2002 in San Rafael de Heredia.

References

External links
 
2002 World Cup profile - Nación 

1976 births
2002 suicides
People from Guanacaste Province
Association football goalkeepers
Costa Rican footballers
Costa Rica international footballers
2001 UNCAF Nations Cup players
2001 Copa América players
2002 FIFA World Cup players
C.S. Herediano footballers
Costa Rican expatriate footballers
Expatriate footballers in Mexico
Suicides in Costa Rica
Suicides by firearm
Copa Centroamericana-winning players